The 2012 William Jones Cup was the 34th tournament of the William Jones Cup that took place at the Taipei Physical Education College Gymnasium in Taipei, Republic of China (commonly known as Taiwan) from August 18 to 26, 2012.

As in previous tournaments, this year's edition of the Jones Cup uses a single round robin format. The Philippines men's national basketball team won the championship by ending the tournament with the best win–loss record. The Philippines clinched the title with a 76-75 win over the United States Jones Cup National Team the tournament's final game day.

Men's tournament

Team standings

|}

Results
All times in UTC+8.

Day 1

Day 2

Day 3

Day 4

Day 5

Day 6

Day 7

Day 8

Day 9

Awards

References

External links
Coverage Site
Boxscores
Boxscores (Chinese)

2012
2012–13 in Taiwanese basketball
2012–13 in American basketball
2012–13 in Asian basketball